Lysosomal-associated membrane protein 1 (LAMP-1) also known as lysosome-associated membrane glycoprotein 1 and CD107a (Cluster of Differentiation 107a), is a protein that in humans is encoded by the LAMP1 gene. The human LAMP1 gene is located on the long arm (q) of chromosome 13 at region 3, band 4 (13q34).

Lysosomal-associated membrane protein 1 is a glycoprotein from a family of Lysosome-associated membrane glycoproteins. The LAMP-1 glycoprotein is a type I transmembrane protein which is expressed at high or medium levels in at least 76 different normal tissue cell types. It resides primarily across lysosomal membranes, and functions to provide selectins with carbohydrate ligands. CD107a has also been shown to be a marker of degranulation on lymphocytes such as CD8+ and NK cells, and may also play a role in tumor cell differentiation and metastasis.

Structure 

Residing primarily across lysosomal membranes, these glycoproteins consist of a large, highly glycosylated end with N-linked carbon chains on the luminal side of the membrane, and a short C-terminal tail exposed to the cytoplasm. The extracytoplasmic region contains a hinge-like structure which can form disulphide bridges homologous to those observed in human immunoglobulin A. Other characteristics of the structure of the LAMP-1 glycoproteins include:
 A polypeptide core of ~40kDa
 18 {N-glycosylation} sites to help with the addition of sugar chains
 Polylactosamine attachments which protect the glyocoprotein from degradation by lysosomal proteases
 Significant quantities of polylactosaminoglycan and sialic acid to traverse the trans-Golgi cisternae.
 poly-N-acetyllactosamine groups which are involved in interactions with selectin and other glycan-binding proteins

Function 

LAMP1 and LAMP2 glycoproteins comprise 50% of all lysosomal membrane proteins, and are thought to be responsible in part for maintaining lysosomal integrity, pH and catabolism.  The expression of LAMP1 and LAMP2 glycoproteins are linked, as deficiencies in LAMP1 gene will lead to increased expression of LAMP2 glycoproteins. The two are therefore thought to share similar functions in vivo. However, this makes the determining the precise function of LAMP1 difficult, because while the LAMP1 deficient phenotype is little different than the wild type due to LAMP2 up regulation, the LAMP1/LAMP2 double deficient phenotype leads to embryonic lethality.

Although the LAMP1 glycoproteins primarily reside across lysosomal membranes, in certain cases they can be expressed across the plasma membrane of the cell. Expression of LAMP1 at the cell surface can occur due to lysosomal fusion with the cell membrane. Cell surface expression of LAMP1 can serve as a ligand for selectins and help mediate cell-cell adhesion. Accordingly, cell surface expression of LAMP1 is seen in cells with migratory or invasive functions, such as cytotoxic T cells, platelets and macrophages. Cell surface expression of LAMP1 and LAMP2 is also often seen in cancer cells, particularly cancers with high metastatic potential, such as colon carcinoma and melanoma, and has been shown to correlate with their metastatic potential.

Role in cancer 

LAMP1 expression on the surface of tumor cells has been observed for a number of different cancer types, particularly in highly metastatic cancers such as pancreatic cancer, colon cancer and melanoma. The structure of LAMP1 correlates with differentiation and metastatic potential of tumor cells as it is thought to help mediate cell-cell adhesion  and migration. Indeed, the adhesion of some cancer cells to the extracellular matrix is mediated by interactions between LAMP1 and LAMP2 and E-selectin and galectins, with the LAMPs serving as ligands for the cell-adhesion molecules.

Cell membrane expression of LAMP-1 observed in the following cancer types:
 Human fibrosarcoma,
 Colon adenocarcinoma,
 Melanoma,
 Pancreatic adenocarcinoma, and
 Astrocytoma.

See also 
 Cluster of differentiation

References

Further reading

External links 
 
 PDBe-KB provides an overview of all the structure information available in the PDB for Human Lysosome-associated membrane glycoprotein 1

Clusters of differentiation